Southport Lord Street (later also known as the Ribble Building, after being used by the Ribble Bus Company as a bus terminus) was a railway station located on Lord Street, Southport, Merseyside, England. It was the terminus of the Southport & Cheshire Lines Extension Railway from Liverpool.

The station closed in 1952, the building was subsequently used as a bus station and later a supermarket. It is now a hotel.

Station history
The station opened on 1 September 1884, as the Southport & Cheshire Lines Extension Railway's (SCLER) northern terminus. The line ran from Aintree Central in the northern suburbs of Liverpool. The new line provided passengers with an alternative through route to Liverpool city centre, to that run by the Lancashire & Yorkshire Railway (Southport Chapel Street - Liverpool Exchange). It also provided an alternative route from Southport to Manchester.

From the outset the SCLER line was no competition to that of the L&Y's more direct coastal route, as the route of the Cheshire Lines Committee (CLC) into Liverpool skirted around the eastern areas of Liverpool, travelling down to Hunts Cross in the south and then back up to Liverpool Central High Level. The line only proving to be relatively popular during the summer months and never really taking off as a commuter route. Its heaviest traffic by far was for a short period in 1941 when the competing L&Y line had been severed by German bombing in the May Liverpool Blitz. During late 1942 the timetable showed five CLC trains each weekday to Southport of which two started at Manchester (Central).

The building itself was a grand affair, fronting directly onto Lord Street. The station had five platforms linked at their ends and by a footbridge. It had been intended by the SCLER to link their tracks to that of that L&Y's, providing the CLC with access to the northern suburbs of Southport. This had never been agreed with the LYR, so the provision of the footbridge on this basis, was speculative.

The station had a two track engine shed and turntable on the south side of the station yard. It closed on 7 July 1952 and was subsequently demolished.

The station first closed in 1917, along with all other stations on the extension line, as a World War I economy measure. It reopened in 1919, until 7 January 1952, when the SCLER was closed to passengers from Aintree Central northwards. The line remained open for public goods traffic until 7 July 1952 at Southport Lord Street, Birkdale Palace and Altcar & Hillhouse stations. Public goods facilities were ended at Woodvale, Lydiate and Sefton & Maghull stations on the same date as passenger services (7 January 1952) and there were never any goods facilities at Ainsdale Beach station to begin with. After 7 July 1952, a siding remained open at Altcar & Hillhouse for private goods facilities until May 1960. The last passenger train to run on part of the SCLER was a railway enthusiasts' 'special' between Aintree and Altcar & Hillhouse stations on 6 June 1959.

Subsequent uses of building

After closure Southport Lord Street railway station was taken over by Ribble Buses. The spaces in between the platforms were filled in, but apart from that the interior remained the same. The trainshed remained in use by the bus company until Ribble Buses ceased to operate from the building in the 1990s. The trainshed was later demolished. The frontage on Lord Street was retained and exists today. The clock tower still shows 'SCLER' below the clock itself, making reference to its former role. Morrisons supermarket occupies the space behind the facade.

Work began in early 2013 on renovating the building as a six-storey, 101-bedroom Travelodge hotel and restaurant. Having been empty for over 10 years this was the first time a business had taken use of the building since Ribble Buses used it as a bus station. The hotel opened in 2014.

Notes and references

Notes

Sources

External links
 The station Disused Stations UK
 The station on a 1948 OS Map npe maps
 The station and line railwaycodes
 The station approach in 1927 Britain from Above (free login needed to zoom)
 The station roof and approach in 1927 Britain from Above (free login needed to zoom)
 The station and approach in 1947 Britain from Above (free login needed to zoom)
 The station and approach in 1951 Britain from Above (free login needed to zoom)

Disused railway stations in the Metropolitan Borough of Sefton
Former Cheshire Lines Committee stations
Railway stations in Great Britain opened in 1884
Railway stations in Great Britain closed in 1917
Railway stations in Great Britain opened in 1919
Railway stations in Great Britain closed in 1952
Buildings and structures in Southport